is a railway station in Kita-ku, Hamamatsu,  Shizuoka Prefecture, Japan, operated by the third sector Tenryū Hamanako Railroad.

Lines
Hamanako-Sakume Station is served by the Tenryū Hamanako Line, and is located 50.7 kilometers from the starting point of the line at Kakegawa Station.

Station layout
The station has a single side platform. The station building doubles as a local cafe. The station is located directly on the shores of Lake Hamana. The station is unattended.

Adjacent stations

|-
!colspan=5|Tenryū Hamanako Railroad

Station history
Hamanako-Sakume Station was established on April 1, 1938 as a station of the Japan National Railways Futamata Line with the completion of the Kanasashi-Mikkabi extension. Freight services were discontinued from 1962, and small parcel services from 1970, after which time the station was no longer staffed. After the privatization of JNR on March 15, 1987, the station came under the control of the Tenryū Hamanako Line.

Passenger statistics
In fiscal 2016, the station was used by an average of 25 passengers daily (boarding passengers only).

Surrounding area
Lake Hamana
Japan National Route 362

See also
 List of Railway Stations in Japan

External links

   Tenryū Hamanako Railroad Station information 
 

Railway stations in Shizuoka Prefecture
Railway stations in Japan opened in 1938
Stations of Tenryū Hamanako Railroad
Railway stations in Hamamatsu